Antoa is a town in the Ashanti Region of Ghana. The town is known for the Antoa Secondary School.  The school is a second cycle institution. This is also where the deity river Antoa Nyama is found.

References

Populated places in the Ashanti Region